The 37 mm automatic air defense gun M1939 (61-K) is a Soviet 37 mm calibre anti-aircraft gun developed during the late 1930s and used during World War II. The land-based version was replaced in Soviet service by the AZP S-60 during the 1950s. Guns of this type were successfully used throughout the Eastern Front against dive bombers and other low- and medium-altitude targets. It also had some usefulness against lightly armoured ground targets.

Development
The Soviet Navy purchased a number of Bofors 25 mm Model 1933 guns in 1935, trials of the weapon were successful and it was decided to develop a 45 mm version of the weapon designated the 49-K. The development under the guidance of leading Soviet designers M. N. Loginov, I. A. Lyamin and L. V. Lyuliev was successful, but the army thought that the 45 mm calibre was a little too large for an automatic field weapon. In January 1938 the Artillery Factory Number 8 in Sverdlovsk was ordered to develop a 37 mm weapon based on the same design. The task was fulfilled by the chief designer of the factory, Mikhail Loginov, and his assistant Lev Loktev. Firing trials of the new 61-K were conducted in October 1938.

Competitive firing trials were conducted in 1940 between the 61-K and the Bofors 40 mm/56. There were no substantial differences found between them.

Land version
The weapon was initially installed as a single-barrel weapon on a four-wheeled ZU-7 carriage, and was soon ready for service. An initial order for 900 units was placed. The gun was operated by a crew of eight men. A total of 200 rounds of ammunition were carried which were fed into the gun in five-round clips. Total Soviet production was around 20,000 units, ending in 1945. However, it has also been produced in Poland, China and North Korea.

Armour penetration of the armour-piercing (AP) rounds is reported as 37 millimetres of rolled homogeneous armour (RHA) at 60°at 500 metres range and 28 millimetres of RHA at 90° at 1,500 metres range.

Naval version
The naval mounting was produced as the 70K, and had entered service before the German invasion of the Soviet Union replacing the semi-automatic 45 mm/46 21-K on many ships. It was fitted in large numbers to Soviet ships during the Second World War, including the T301 class minesweeper. The V70K was produced until 1955, with a total of 3,113 built.

One drawback was that the 70K required a barrel change after every 100 rounds fired. To improve on this, a twin-barrel water cooled mount, the V-11 (called "W-11" in East Germany and Poland because of different Cyrillic transliteration), entered service in 1946, and was in production until 1957. A total of 1,872 V-11 mounts were built.

However it was later replaced with the ZIF-31 twin 57 mm mounting.

The 37 mm twin mounting was exported to China where it was manufactured and used extensively, as the "Type 65". A turret based version was produced from the late 1980s called the "Type 76" or H/PJA 76.

ZSU-37
The ZSU-37 was developed late in the Second World War, it was a single 37 mm gun mounted in a large open turret on the chassis of the SU-76 self-propelled gun .

Specifications

 Recoil length: 150 to 175 mm

Ammunition
 
The cannon fires 37×252SR shells. The shells use brass cases lined with waxed paper and use KV-2U percussion primers. A small piece of lead-tin wire is included in the case to act as a de-coppering agent, to counteract the buildup of copper from the driving bands of the projectiles. The Ammunition is produced in a number of countries including China, Russia, Egypt, Pakistan and Yugoslavia. The projectiles themselves are identical to those fired by the NS-37 aircraft cannon. The explosive shells are fitted with point detonating fuzes making them unsuitable for engaging fast moving or small targets.

Variants
 Norinco (Chinese)
 
 Type 55 – copy of the single barreled 37 mm M1939
 Type 63 – twin 37 mm guns with vertical stabilization mounted on a T-34 chassis.
 Type 65 – copy of the twin barreled 37 mm.
 Type 74 – upgraded version of the Type 65 with a greater rate of fire.
 Type 74SD – Type 74 with servo system removed for operation with Type 800 laser course director system.
 Type 79-III – upgraded version of the Type 74 with electro-optical director, and powered traverse and elevation.
 Type 76 – Naval version of the twin 37 mm.
 P793 – Advanced twin-barrel version, with electro-optical predicting sight and higher rate of fire and lengthened barrels giving a higher muzzle velocity (1,000 m/s). Operated by a crew of 5 or 6.
 North Korea
 Self-propelled version

Comparison of anti-aircraft guns

Users

Current operators

Former operators

See also
Weapons of the Laotian Civil War
Weapons of the Lebanese Civil War

Notes

References

 
 
 Janes, Ammunition Handbook 2003–2004
 Janes, Land Based Air Defense 2005–2006
 Shunkov V. N. – The Weapons of the Red Army, Mn. Harvest, 1999 (Шунков В. Н. – Оружие Красной Армии. — Мн.: Харвест, 1999.) 
 

37 mm artillery
Anti-aircraft guns of the Soviet Union
World War II anti-aircraft guns
World War II artillery of the Soviet Union
Military equipment introduced in the 1930s